Thomas Breckenridge (born 26 February 1865 in Edinburgh; died 3 May 1898 in Edinburgh) was a Scottish footballer, who played for Heart of Midlothian, Leith Athletic and Scotland.

References

Sources

External links

London Hearts profile

1865 births
Year of death missing
Scottish footballers
Scotland international footballers
Heart of Midlothian F.C. players
Leith Athletic F.C. players
Association football inside forwards
Footballers from Edinburgh